The Women's Super-G competition of the Nagano 1998 Olympics was held at Hakuba on Wednesday, February 11.

The defending world champion was Isolde Kostner of Italy, while Germany's Hilde Gerg was the defending World Cup Super G champion.
 Defending Olympic champion Diann Roffe had retired from competition in 1994. This was the opening women's alpine event of these Olympics.

Picabo Street of the United States won the gold medal by one-hundredth of a second, Austria's Michaela Dorfmeister took the silver, and the bronze medalist was Alexandra Meissnitzer, also of Austria. Gerg was tenth and Kostner eleventh, while downhill gold medalist Katja Seizinger was sixth.

Street had never won a super-G event, though she had two World Cup podiums; her nine World Cup wins were all in downhill. Returning from injuries, this was the final podium of her career; she was sixth in the downhill, then broke her leg a month later in Switzerland, which ended her presence as a top competitor.

Street's winning time was 78.02 seconds, yielding an average course speed of 

Results
The race was started at 13:00 local time, (UTC +9).

References

External links
FIS results
Results

Women's Super-G
Olymp
Women's events at the 1998 Winter Olympics